Jack Edward O'Brien (born October 21, 1932) is an American former college and professional football player who was an end in the National Football League (NFL) for three seasons during the mid-1950s.  O'Brien played college football for the University of Florida, and thereafter, he played professionally for the Pittsburgh Steelers of the NFL.

Early years 

O'Brien was born in Jeannette, Pennsylvania in 1932.  He attended Jeannette Senior High School, and he played for the Jeannette Jayhawks high school football team.

College career 

O'Brien attended the University of Florida in Gainesville, Florida, where he played for coach Bob Woodruff's Florida Gators football team from 1951 to 1953.  In an era when college football rules allowed only limited player substitutions, he played both offensive end and defensive end, and was rated as one of the Gators' five best ends of the 1950s by coach Woodruff.  O'Brien was a junior starter for the 1952 Gators team that posted an 8–3 record and defeated the Tulsa Golden Hurricane 14–13 in the 1953 New Year's Day Gator Bowl—the first NCAA-sanctioned post-season bowl game in Gators history.  Together with running back Rick Casares, he was a senior team captain in 1953.  Woodruff later ranked O'Brien as one of the Gators' five best receivers of the 1950s.

After his NFL career was over, O'Brien returned to Gainesville and graduated from the University of Florida with a bachelor's degree in physical education in 1958.

Professional career 

In an era of run-oriented offenses, O'Brien made the most of his few catches—he had sixteen receptions for 185 yards (an average of 11.6 yards per catch) and two touchdowns.

See also 

 Florida Gators football, 1950–59
 List of Florida Gators in the NFL Draft
 List of Pittsburgh Steelers players
 List of University of Florida alumni

References

Bibliography 

 Carlson, Norm, University of Florida Football Vault: The History of the Florida Gators, Whitman Publishing, LLC, Atlanta, Georgia (2007).  .
 Golenbock, Peter, Go Gators!  An Oral History of Florida's Pursuit of Gridiron Glory, Legends Publishing, LLC, St. Petersburg, Florida (2002).  .
 Hairston, Jack, Tales from the Gator Swamp: A Collection of the Greatest Gator Stories Ever Told, Sports Publishing, LLC, Champaign, Illinois (2002).  .
 McCarthy, Kevin M.,  Fightin' Gators: A History of University of Florida Football, Arcadia Publishing, Mount Pleasant, South Carolina (2000).  .
 McEwen, Tom, The Gators: A Story of Florida Football, The Strode Publishers, Huntsville, Alabama (1974).  .
 Nash, Noel, ed., The Gainesville Sun Presents The Greatest Moments in Florida Gators Football, Sports Publishing, Inc., Champaign, Illinois (1998).  .
 Proctor, Samuel, & Wright Langley, Gator History: A Pictorial History of the University of Florida, South Star Publishing Company, Gainesville, Florida (1986).  .

1932 births
Living people
People from Jeannette, Pennsylvania
Sportspeople from the Pittsburgh metropolitan area
Players of American football from Pennsylvania
American football ends
Florida Gators football players
Pittsburgh Steelers players